Abdylas Maldybaevich Maldybaev (July 7, 1906 – June 1, 1978) was a Kyrgyz composer, actor, and operatic tenor singer. Maldybaev was one of the composers of the state anthem of the Kirghiz SSR and is still renowned for his operatic composition. He helped popularize Kyrgyz music by skillfully using Western European techniques. The Kyrgyz one som banknote pictures him.

Maldybayev provided folk melodies and composed music which was organized and prepared by Russian composers Vladimir Vlasov and Vladimir Fere into six Soviet state operas and other works. Their first full opera was Ai-churek. The collective is usually hyphenated as Vlasov-Fere-Maldybayev, which also composed the Kirghiz national anthem.

Works
 Ai-Churek, opera in four acts after an episode of the "Manas Epos" (1938–1939) Libretto: D. Tursubekov, D. Bokonbaev and K. Malikov. First performance in 1939 in Frunze.
 The History of Happiness, cantata after V. Vinnikov (1949)
 On the Banks of Issyk-Kula, opera after K. Bayalinov and V. Vinnikov (1950)
 Toktogul, opera (1958)

His work has been recorded and issued on media including:
 Ai-Churek, LP Melodiya D 07269-74: Soloists, Chorus and Orchestra of the Kirghiz State Theatre Opera & Ballet, Dzhumakhmatov (conductor), 1938
 On the Banks of Issyk-Kul, LP Melodiya D 2253-4: Radio Orchestra, Tselikovsky (conductor), S. Kiyzbayeva (soprano), K. Chodronov (bass), 1950
 Toktogul, LP Melodiya D 4610-1: (Fragments) Chorus and Orchestra of the Khirgiz State Theatre Opera & Ballet, Dzhumakhmatov (conductor), 1958

References

External links
UNESCO description
Lyrics of national anthem
Biography at Liverum (Russian)

1906 births
1978 deaths
People from Chüy Region
People from Semirechye Oblast
Kyrgyzstani composers
Kyrgyzstani opera singers
Operatic tenors
20th-century classical composers
Kyrgyzstani opera composers
Soviet opera composers
Soviet male composers
Kyrgyzstani male singers
Soviet tenors
Soviet male opera singers
Male classical composers